FC Minneapolis (known informally as FCM or The City Lions) is an American soccer team based in Minneapolis, Minnesota, United States. Founded in 2014, the team plays in the United Premier Soccer League, a national league at the fourth tier of the American Soccer Pyramid.

History
Founded in 2014 as a member of the Minnesota Recreational Soccer League, playing in the Sunday Division One, the club's mission was to provide a quality, accessible and equitable pathway to professional football for all players in the United States. As such, in 2015, the club became one of the founding members of the now defunct American Premier League, becoming league champions in their inaugural season and finishing 5th position out of five teams in 2016. The club is partially owned by "supporter group members" who make game related decisions for the team, such as the team jersey, game day amenities, and future opponents for friendly matches.
In 2018, they joined the United Premier Soccer League. In 2019, they finished their spring season of the Midwest Conference West Division at four wins, three draws and three losses, good for third place in the league. Their first competitive game of the United Premier Soccer League was a 5-4 loss against Granite City FC in St. Cloud, Minnesota. The club's first goal of the United Premier Soccer League was scored by Lorestho Banks in their away match, a 5–4 defeat to Granite City FC at Huskys Dome of St. Cloud State University.

Honors
 2019 U.S. National Cup Regional Quarter Finals
 2020 Minnesota Fall Cup Finals
 2021 U.S. National Cup Regional Finals 
 2021 UPSL Midwest Conference Division Semi Finals
 2021 U.S. National Cup Champions of Regions Semi Finals
 2021 U.S. National Cup Champions of Regions Third Place

Season-by-season

Current roster 

Note: Flags indicate national team as defined under FIFA eligibility rules. Players may hold more than one non-FIFA nationality.

Technical Team
 Oluwalaanu David - Head Coach
 Mohammed Ulel - Assistant Coach
 Miguel Lopez - Strength & Conditioning Coach
 Dave Knibbs - Head Scout
 Nicholas Moe - Team Doctor

Historic record vs opponents

Updated to mid of August of 2021

References

External links
 

Association football clubs established in 2014
Soccer clubs in Minnesota
United Premier Soccer League teams
Sports in Minneapolis
2014 establishments in Minnesota